The Antoine was a Belgian automobile manufactured by Victor Antoine of Liège, an engine manufacturer, from 1900 to 1903. At least two models were offered.  One was a  voiturette.  The other, offered in 1903, was a 15/25 hp car.

Veteran vehicles
Defunct motor vehicle manufacturers of Belgium